The Nimu Maqu River is a left tributary of the Yarlung Tsangpo River (upper Brahmaputra) that flows south through Nyêmo County in Lhasa Municipality, Tibet, China.

Course
The Nimu Maqu is the main river of Nyêmo County and an important tributary of the Yarlung Tsangpo.

Flow

The climate is temperate semi-arid plateau monsoon, with most precipitation falling in the summer.

References

Sources

Rivers of Lhasa
Tributaries of the Brahmaputra River
Nyêmo County